Wiśniewski (feminine: Wiśniewska, plural Wiśniewscy) is the third most common surname in Poland (111,174 people in 2009). It is a toponymic surname derived from any of locations named Wiśniewa, Wiśniewo, Wiśniowa, Wiśniew.  It is related to the following surnames in other languages:

In Romania, it appears as Vișinescu (or Vișnescu), taking the Latin-derived suffix –escu.

History
 House of Wiśniowiecki, a Polish princely family of Ruthenian-Lithuanian origin

People

Wisniewski 
 Andreas Wisniewski (born 1959), German actor and dancer
 Connie Wisniewski (1922–1995), American baseball pitcher
 David Wisniewski (1953–2002), British children's author
 Edgar Wisniewski (1930–2007), German architect
 James Wisniewski (born 1984), American ice hockey player
 John S. Wisniewski (born 1962), American politician
 Jonathan Wisniewski, French rugby player
 Keith Wisniewski (born 1981), American mixed martial arts fighter
 Leo Wisniewski (born 1959), American football player
 Margarethe Wisniewski known professionally as Margarete Schlegel (1899–1987), German theatre and film actress and soprano operetta singer
 Maryan Wisniewski (born 1937), French footballer
 Paul Wisniewski (born 1949), British radio broadcaster and television reporter
 Stefan Wisniewski (born 1953), German member of the Red Army Faction
 Stefen Wisniewski, American football player
 Steve Wisniewski (born 1967), American football player
 Matt Wisniewski (born 1990), American artist

Wiśniewski 
 Adam Wiśniewski (born 1980), Polish handballer
 Adam Wiśniewski-Snerg (1937–1995), Polish science fiction author
 Andrzej Wiśniewski, Polish football manager
 Jacek Wiśniewski (born 1974), Polish footballer
 Jan Wiktor Wiśniewski (1922-2006), Polish footballer
 Janek Wiśniewski, fictional name for Zbigniew Godlewski (1952–1970), Polish demonstrator
 Janusz Leon Wiśniewski (born 1954), Polish writer and chemist
 Józef Wiśniewski (1940–1996), Polish ice hockey player
 Łukasz Wiśniewski (born 1989), Polish volleyball player
 Michał Wiśniewski (born 1972), Polish pop vocalist
 Mieczysław Wiśniewski (1892–1952), Polish footballer 
 Piotr Wiśniewski (born 1982), Polish footballer
 Przemysław Wiśniewski, Polish footballer
 Radosław Wiśniewski, Polish footballer
 Wiesław Z. Wiśniewski (1931–1994), Polish astronomer
 2256 Wiśniewski, an asteroid named in his honour
 Zenon Wiśniewski (born 1959), Polish politician

Wiśniewska 
Ania Wiśniewska (born 1977), Polish pop singer
Ewa Wiśniewska (born 1942), Polish actress
Jadwiga Wiśniewska (born 1963), Polish politician
Joanna Wiśniewska (born 1972), Polish discus thrower
Lucyna Wiśniewska (born 1955), Polish politician
Marta Wiśniewska (born 1978), Polish dancer and singer, also known as Mandaryna
Maria Pasło-Wiśniewska (born 1959), Polish politician

Wischnewski 
Anke Wischnewski (born 1978), German luger
Hans-Jürgen Wischnewski (1922–2005), German politician
Siegfried Wischnewski (1922–1989), German actor

Wiśniowski
Łukasz Wiśniowski (born 1991), Polish racing cyclist
Michal Wisniowski (born 1980), Polish artist

Places
Wólka Wiśniewska, a village in east-central Poland
Wiśniew, Siedlce County, a village in Poland
Wiśniew, Mińsk County, a village in Poland
Wiśniewo (disambiguation), other places in Poland

See also
 
 
Vishnevsky, similar Russian surname
Vishnevetsky, similar Ukrainian surname
Vyšniauskas, similar Lithuanian surname

References

Polish-language surnames
Slavic-language surnames